William Frederick Evans (known as Bill Evans) (24 April 1857 – 1 July 1935) was a Welsh international rugby union player, who won two caps for Wales in 1882 and 1883.

Rugby career
Evans was born in Rhymney, Monmouthshire. He was educated at Christ College, Brecon, Sherborne School and Jesus College, Oxford, representing Oxford University rugby club (but did not win a "Blue").

He was a three-quarter and represented the Wales national rugby union team on two occasions. His debut for Wales was in a friendly on 28 January 1882 against Ireland. In the following season, he played against Scotland in the Home Nations Championship.

Later life
After his rugby career in Wales, Evans moved to Gloucestershire, where he began teaching. He later emigrated to Australia, and continued his teaching career, becoming headmaster of Fremantle Grammar School from 1887–90 and then Adelaide Grammar School from 1890–91. Evans continued his teaching after returning to Wales, but in his latter life became homeless, living rough in the hills surrounding his home town. He died in 1935.

Bibliography

References

1857 births
1935 deaths
Alumni of Jesus College, Oxford
Cardiff RFC players
Newport RFC players
Oxford University RFC players
People educated at Christ College, Brecon
People educated at Sherborne School
Rugby union centres
Rugby union players from Rhymney
Wales international rugby union players
Welsh rugby union players